Pine Valley is a hamlet and census-designated place in the towns of Catlin and Veteran in Chemung County, New York, United States. The population was 813 at the 2010 census.

Geography
Pine Valley is located in northwestern Chemung County on the border of the towns of Catlin (to the west) and Veteran (to the east). It is on the west side of the valley of Catharine Creek, a northward-flowing tributary of Seneca Lake, one of the Finger Lakes.

Demographics

References

Hamlets in New York (state)
Census-designated places in New York (state)
Census-designated places in Chemung County, New York
Hamlets in Chemung County, New York